Miriam Louise Tildesley (1 July 1883 – 31 January 1979) was an English anthropologist.

Life
The daughter of William Henry Tildesley and Rebecca Fisher, she was born in Willenhall, Staffordshire and was educated in Birmingham. She trained as a teacher and spent three years teaching. She was involved in statistical work during World War I, working with Professor Karl Pearson of University College London. In 1918, she was named Crewdson Benington research student in craniometry, working under Professor Pearson. In 1920, she was named by the Council for Scientific and Industrial Research to work on the human osteological collections at the Hunterian Museum at the Royal College of Surgeons.

In 1923, Tildesley published Sir Thomas Browne: his skull, portraits and ancestry. The stated purpose of this document was to explore to what extent various racial characteristics and knowledge about the individual could be derived from a study of their skull. While Tildesley found that Browne's skill was typical of English males, she concluded that, in this case, there appeared to be little correlation between the characteristics of the skull and its owner's mental capacity.

Also in 1923, she was named a research assistant in charge of the collections at the Hunterian Museum; she served as a curator of human osteology for the museum from 1932 to 1934. In 1939, Tildesley was named a fellow of the Royal Anthropological Institute (RAI). She served on the council for the RAI for a number of years and was vice-president from 1952 to 1955. She also served as chair of the Comité de Standardisation de la Technique Anthropologique. She was named a member in the Order of the British Empire for her contributions to anthropology.

She died at Henley-on-Thames, Oxfordshire at the age of 95.

References

External links

 Image of Miriam Tildesley

1883 births
1979 deaths
English anthropologists
Members of the Order of the British Empire
People from Willenhall
British women anthropologists
20th-century British women scientists